The Centre or The Center may refer to:

Places
 The Centre (Evansville), Indiana, U.S., now Old National Events Plaza
 The Centre (Saskatoon), Saskatchewan, Canada, a shopping mall 
 The Centre (Livingston), West Lothian, Scotland, a shopping mall
 The Centre, Bristol, England, a public open space 
 The Center, Hong Kong, a skyscraper
 The Center, New Mexico, U.S., a proposed technology facility
 The Centre, former name for Qmunity, an LGBT community centre in Vancouver, British Columbia, Canada

Arts and entertainment
 The Center (TV series), an American afternoon music program
 The Centre, a fictional entity in Dinosaur Island
 The Centre, a fictional organization in the TV series The Pretender
 The Center, a fictional organization in the TV series Martin Mystery
 "The Centre", sixth episode of the 1965 Doctor Who serial The Web Planet
 "The Centre", an episode of Gimme a Break!

Other uses
 informal name for the Government of India
 The Centre (political party), in Switzerland

See also 

 Center (disambiguation)
 Centro (disambiguation)
 El Centro, California, a place in U.S.
 LaCenter, Kentucky, a place in U.S.
 La Center, Washington, a place in U.S.
 La Center (sternwheeler), a steamboat 
 Absolute (philosophy)
 Central business district
 City centre
 Downtown
 Government of the Soviet Union